The canton of Saint-Alban-Leysse is an administrative division of the Savoie department, southeastern France. Its borders were modified at the French canton reorganisation which came into effect in March 2015. Its seat is in Saint-Alban-Leysse.

It consists of the following communes:

Aillon-le-Jeune
Aillon-le-Vieux
Arith
Barby
Bassens
Bellecombe-en-Bauges
Le Châtelard
La Compôte
Curienne
Les Déserts
Doucy-en-Bauges
École
Jarsy
Lescheraines
La Motte-en-Bauges
Le Noyer
Puygros
Saint-Alban-Leysse
Sainte-Reine
Saint-François-de-Sales
Saint-Jean-d'Arvey
Thoiry
La Thuile
Verel-Pragondran

References

Cantons of Savoie